Avi Wigderson (born 9 September 1956) is an Israeli mathematician and computer scientist. He is the Herbert H. Maass Professor in the school of mathematics at the Institute for Advanced Study in Princeton, New Jersey, United States of America. His research interests include complexity theory, parallel algorithms, graph theory, cryptography, distributed computing, and neural networks. Wigderson received the Abel Prize in 2021 for his work in theoretical computer science.

Biography
Avi Wigderson was born in Haifa, Israel, to Holocaust survivors. Wigderson is a graduate of the Hebrew Reali School in Haifa, and did his undergraduate studies at the Technion in Haifa, Israel, graduating in 1980, and went on to graduate study at Princeton University. He received his PhD in computer science in 1983 after completing a doctoral dissertation, titled "Studies in computational complexity", under the supervision of Richard Lipton. After short-term positions at the University of California, Berkeley, the IBM Almaden Research Center in San Jose, California, and the Mathematical Sciences Research Institute in Berkeley, he joined the faculty of Hebrew University in 1986. In 1999 he also took a position at the Institute for Advanced Study, and in 2003 he gave up his Hebrew University position to take up full-time residence at the IAS.

Awards and honors
Wigderson received the Nevanlinna Prize in 1994 for his work on computational complexity. Along with Omer Reingold and Salil Vadhan he won the 2009 Gödel Prize for work on the zig-zag product of graphs, a method of combining smaller graphs to produce larger ones used in the construction of expander graphs. Wigderson was elected as a member of the American Academy of Arts and Sciences in 2011. He was elected to the National Academy of Sciences in 2013.
He was elected as an ACM Fellow in 2018 for "contributions to theoretical computer science and mathematics".
In 2019, Wigderson was awarded the Knuth Prize for his contributions to "the foundations of computer science in areas including randomized computation, cryptography, circuit complexity, proof complexity, parallel computation, and our understanding of fundamental graph properties".

In 2021 Wigderson shared the Abel Prize with László Lovász "for their foundational contributions to theoretical computer science and discrete mathematics, and their leading role in shaping them into central fields of modern mathematics."

References

External links
Avi Wigderson's home page

1956 births
Living people
20th-century American scientists
20th-century Israeli engineers
21st-century American scientists
21st-century engineers
Abel Prize laureates
American people of Israeli descent
Fellows of the Association for Computing Machinery
Gödel Prize laureates
Knuth Prize laureates
Academic staff of the Hebrew University of Jerusalem
Institute for Advanced Study faculty
Israeli computer scientists
20th-century Israeli mathematicians
Members of the United States National Academy of Sciences
Nevanlinna Prize laureates
Princeton University alumni
Technion – Israel Institute of Technology alumni
Theoretical computer scientists